Buckingham is a village in Kankakee County, Illinois, United States. The population was 300 at the 2010 census, up from 237 at the 2000 census. The village is about 63.7 miles south west of Chicago Illinois.  It is included in the Kankakee-Bradley, Illinois Metropolitan Statistical Area.

The Coal Branch line of the Kankakee and Southwestern Railroad branched off in Buckingham and ran to the now lost, nearby towns of Clarke City and Tracy.

Geography
Buckingham is located in southwestern Kankakee County at  (41.046340, -88.173608).

Demographics

As of the census of 2000, there were 237 people, 80 households, and 66 families residing in the village. The racial makeup of the village was 100.00% White. Hispanic or Latino of any race were 0.84% of the population.

There were 80 households, out of which 45.0% had children under the age of 18 living with them, 67.5% were married couples living together, 10.0% had a female householder with no husband present, and 17.5% were non-families. 15.0% of all households were made up of individuals, and 5.0% had someone living alone who was 65 years of age or older. The average household size was 2.96 and the average family size was 3.32.

In the village, the population was spread out, with 32.9% under the age of 18, 6.8% from 18 to 24, 35.0% from 25 to 44, 19.4% from 45 to 64, and 5.9% who were 65 years of age or older. The median age was 34 years. For every 100 females, there were 100.8 males. For every 100 females age 18 and over, there were 109.2 males.

The median income for a household in the village was $53,542, and the median income for a family was $68,750. Males had a median income of $40,000 versus $29,375 for females. The per capita income for the village was $19,816. About 6.3% of families and 8.3% of the population were below the poverty line, including 14.5% of those under the age of eighteen and 15.4% of those 65 or over.

References

Villages in Kankakee County, Illinois
Villages in Illinois